Cassinia tenuifolia, commonly known as bully bush or killmoke, is a species of flowering plant in the family Asteraceae and is endemic to Lord Howe Island. It is a dense, bushy shrub with hairy young stems, crowded linear leaves and sweetly scented flower heads arranged in corymbs.

Description
The upper surface of the leaves is glabrous, the edges are rolled downwards and the lower surface is densely cottony-hairy. The heads are crowded in corymbs on the ends of branchlets.

Taxonomy and naming
Cassinia tenuifolia was first formally described in 1867 by George Bentham in Flora Australiensis.

Distribution
Cassinia tenuifolia is endemic to Lord Howe Island where it is widespread and common, especially near the coast and is sometimes considered a weed in pasture.

References

tenuifolia
Asterales of Australia
Endemic flora of Lord Howe Island
Taxa named by George Bentham
Plants described in 1867